Tara Lujan is an American politician serving as a member of the New Mexico House of Representatives from the 48th district. Lujan was appointed to the House by the Santa Fe County Commission on July 23, 2020 after the resignation of Linda Trujillo.

Background 
Lujan is a native of Santa Fe, New Mexico. Prior to her nomination to the House, Lujan served as the human resources director of the New Mexico State Treasurer's Office. Lujan also worked as a campaign manager and legislative analyst for Ben Ray Luján (no relation). Lujan was the Democratic nominee for the New Mexico House in 2020, running unopposed in the general election.

References 

Living people
Hispanic and Latino American state legislators in New Mexico
Hispanic and Latino American women in politics
Democratic Party members of the New Mexico House of Representatives
Women state legislators in New Mexico
People from Santa Fe, New Mexico
Year of birth missing (living people)
21st-century American women